Trần Thanh Vân, also known as Jean Trân Thanh Vân, is a Vietnamese French physicist born on 4 July 1936 in Đồng Hới, Quảng Bình Province in Vietnam.

Biography 
Vân attended secondary school in Huế. In 1953 he left Vietnam for France. He studied mathematics and physics at University of Paris and earned his undergraduate degrees in 1957. In his PhD work, Vân, still at University of Paris,  turned his studies toward particle physics, focusing on the neutron as the natural partner of the proton in the structure of matter. He defended his thesis and obtained his doctoral degree in 1963.

After his PhD, Vân joined the French National Centre for Scientific Research (CNRS), where he spent his whole career. In 1991 he was given the title Directeur de Recherches, the most senior research position in France. As of 2001 he is emeritus Directeur de Recherches.

Vân's scientific work has focused on nucleon interactions at medium energy and the deuteron’s relativistic wave function, the 2-body interactions at high energy, Regge poles and absorption models and the dual parton model. He has co-authored more than 300 scientific articles.

Vân is one of the promoters of the International Year of Basic Sciences for Sustainable Development, which was proclaimed by the United Nations General Assembly in December 2021.

Rencontres 
Trần Thanh Vân has become internationally renowned as the organizer of scientific meetings, in particular for the series Rencontres de Moriond, Rencontres de Blois and Rencontres du Vietnam.

Rencontres de Moriond 
The first meeting took place at Moriond in the French Alps in 1966. This was the very prototype of winter conferences, which has developed to be an essential moment in the high-energy physics year: the moment for which all experimental collaborations prepare a new release of data, and which theorists await with great expectations. At the «Rencontres ‍de ‍Moriond», young ‍scientists—both theorists ‍and experimenters—at ‍the ‍post-doctoral ‍level, ‍meet ‍senior ‍researchers to ‍discuss ‍the results.

Rencontres de Blois 
Since 1989 the «Rencontres de Blois» have been organised in the city of Blois, in France. While the Blois meetings have dealt with several topics, one of their great achievements has been to recognize (like Moriond) the cross-disciplinary field of astroparticle physics. The meetings have covered topics ranging from particle physics to chaos theory, life and planetary science.

Rencontres du Vietnam 
The series «Rencontres du Vietnam»started in 1993 when Vietnam first re-opened to foreign scientists. The meetings are based on the same principle as for Moriond and Blois.

Private life 
He is married to Lê Kim Ngoc since 1961. The couple has two adult children. In 1970 Vân and Ngoc established the association «Aide à l’Enfance du Vietnam», to set up the SOS Children’s Village in Vietnam.

Awards 

  Knight of the National Order of Merit, France (1993)
  Knight of the Legion of Honor, France (1999)
 Certificate of Appreciation, American Physical Society (June 2000)
 Docteur honoris causa, Russian Academy of Sciences (May 2001)
  Friendship order, Vietnam (2015)
 Tate Medal for International Leadership in Physics (2011)
 Docteur honoris causa, Joint Institute for Nuclear Research (2016)

References 

French physicists
Living people
Chevaliers of the Légion d'honneur
Knights of the Ordre national du Mérite
French people of Vietnamese descent
Recipients of the Friendship Order
1936 births
French National Centre for Scientific Research scientists
Scientists from Paris
University of Paris alumni